Lorenzo Pecchia (born 24 February 2002) is an Italian footballer who plays as a midfielder for Livorno.

Club career
On 1 February 2021, he was loaned to Serie D side Pro Livorno Sorgenti.

Club statistics

Club

Notes

References

2002 births
Living people
Italian footballers
Association football midfielders
U.S. Livorno 1915 players
Serie B players
Serie C players
Serie D players